The 1965 European Ladies' Team Championship took place 5–10 July at Royal The Hague Golf & Country Club in Wassenaar, 10 kilometres north of the city center of  The Hague, Netherlands. It was the fourth women's golf amateur European Ladies' Team Championship.

Venue 
The course was designed in 1938, by Harry Colt and C.H. Alison and is situated in an undulating dune landscape.

The championship course was set up with par 73.

It was raining and blowing hard winds during the tournament.

Format 
All participating teams played two qualification rounds of stroke play, counting the three best scores out of up to four players for each team. The four best teams formed flight A. The next four teams formed flight B and the last three teams formed flight C.

The winner in each flight was determined by a round-robin system. All teams in the flight met each other and the team with most points for team matches in flight A won the tournament, using the scale, win=2 points, halved=1 point, lose=0 points. In each match between two nation teams, two foursome games and four single games were played.

Teams 
A record number of eleven nation teams contested the event. England, Scotland and Wales took part for the first time. Ireland was announced to participate but withdraw before the tournament. Each team consisted of a minimum of four players.

Players in the leading teams

Other participating teams

Winners 
Team England, participating for the first time, won the championship, earning 5 points in flight A.

Individual winner in the opening 36-hole stroke play qualifying competition was Brigitte Varangot, France, with a score of 4-over-par 150.

Results 
Qualification rounds

Team standings

Individual leaders

 Note: There was no official recognition for the lowest individual score.

Flight A

Team matches

Team standings

Flight B

Team matches

Team standings

Flight C

Team matches

Team standings

Final standings

Sources:

See also 
 Espirito Santo Trophy – biennial world amateur team golf championship for women organized by the International Golf Federation.
 European Amateur Team Championship – European amateur team golf championship for men organised by the European Golf Association.

References

External links 
 European Golf Association: Results

European Ladies' Team Championship
Golf tournaments in the Netherlands
European Ladies' Team Championship
European Ladies' Team Championship
European Ladies' Team Championship